Tyranny is an American drama and political thriller series that premiered on March 11, 2010 on KoldCast TV. Written and directed by John Beck Hofmann, the series is centered on a man who, after volunteering for a neurological experiment at UC Berkeley in 1999, finds himself having visions of a troubling future and must understand what the visions mean before that future comes to pass.

Hofmann has said that the movies Twelve Monkeys, The Game, Manchurian Candidate, and Kafka were influences on Tyranny.

Characters
 John Beck Hofmann as Daniel McCarthy
 Olga Kurylenko as Mina Harud
 Bitsie Tulloch as Alex Hubbard
 Kieren van den Blink as Isabelle Lorenz
 Mikael Forsberg as Pavel Novak
 Mimi Ferrer as Myra Ripley
 Sarah Coleman as Ariel Huckster
 Aric Green as Ethan Chambers
 Sasha Townsend as Demas Hunter
 Enrico Piazza as Dr. Jacob Malik
 Nathan Marlow as Special Agent Holden
 Steve Collins as Edson Cross
 John Burton, Jr. as Dr. Lloyd Freeman
 Sammy Durrani as July Ripley
 Victor Holstein as Jack Diamond
 Jay Lewis as Malcolm Storz

Awards
Tyranny was accepted as part of the official selection of the Geneva International Film Festival, November 2010. The series also received four 2010 Indie Intertube Award nominations for: sound design, soundtrack, best looking show and best thriller.

References

External links
 
 KoldCast TV (official network of the series)
 

American drama web series
YouTube original programming
Fiction set in 1999